R&M may refer to:

 Reichle & De-Massari (R&M) is a Swiss family business specializing in information and communications technology.
 Urinalysis, also known as routine and microscopy (R&M), is an array of tests performed on urine.
 Rick and Morty